Wiśniowa  is a village in Myślenice County, Lesser Poland Voivodeship, in southern Poland. It is the seat of the gmina (administrative district) called Gmina Wiśniowa.

The village has a population of 1,900.

References

External links
 Jewish Community in Wiśniowa on Virtual Shtetl

Villages in Myślenice County